Jack Smith (born 22 May 1977) is an Australian cricketer. He played in four first-class and four List A matches for South Australia in 2004. Smith made his first class cricket debut in 2004, South Australia vs Victoria. This initiated Smith's professional domestic career.

See also
 List of South Australian representative cricketers

References

External links
 

1977 births
Living people
Australian cricketers
South Australia cricketers
Cricketers from Adelaide